Florence Diya Aya is a Nigerian Politician and business woman. She was born at Garkida  in 1948 and is from Garaje Agban, Kagoro, Kaura Local Government Area of Kaduna State. She was a member of the Kaduna State House of assembly from 1990 to 1993.

Background 
Aya attended her primary school at Waka Girls Primary School from 1957 to 1961. She proceeded to Government Girls College, Dalle, Kano state.

From 1962 to 1966, she worked at the Kashim Ibrahim Library, Ahmadu Bello University, in 1963 to 1969 and as a confidential secretary in the Faculty of Engineering, Ahmadu Bello University Zaria from 1972 to 1984. She was a petroleum products dealer with African Petroleum from 1984 to 1989.

Political career 
Aya became an honorable member of Kaduna state House of Assembly from 1990 to 1993 where she served as a Minority Leader from 1992 to 1993. In 1999, she became a member of the Federal House of Representatives representing Kaura federal constituency in 1999 to 2003. She was the Deputy chairman of Women and Youth Development Committee, committee member of the House Committee on Health, Information and Federal Character. She was also a member of the International Parliamentary Union, the National Council of Women Societies and Women in Politics. She is currently a member of the  Peoples Democratic Party.

Personal life 
She is married to Mr. Yohanna Aya. She has five children.

References 

1948 births
21st-century Nigerian women politicians
Living people